The 1980 NFL draft was the procedure by which National Football League teams selected amateur college football players. It is officially known as the NFL Annual Player Selection Meeting. The draft was held April 29–30, 1980, at the New York Sheraton Hotel in New York City, New York. The league also held a supplemental draft after the regular draft and before the regular season. With the first overall pick of the draft, the Detroit Lions selected running back Billy Sims.

This draft is notable as the first that the nascent ESPN network (which had first gone on the air seven months earlier) aired in its entirety, and the first to be televised.

Player selections

Round one

Round two

Round three

Round four

Round five

Round six

Round seven

Round eight

Round nine

Round ten

Round eleven

Round twelve

Hall of Famers
 Anthony Muñoz, offensive tackle from Southern California, taken 1st round 3rd overall by Cincinnati Bengals
Inducted: Professional Football Hall of Fame class of 1998.
 Dwight Stephenson, center from Alabama, taken 2nd round 48th overall by Miami Dolphins
Inducted: Professional Football Hall of Fame class of 1998.
 Art Monk, wide receiver from Syracuse, taken 1st round 18th overall by Washington Redskins
Inducted: Professional Football Hall of Fame class of 2008.

Notable undrafted players

References

External links
 NFL.com – 1980 Draft
 databaseFootball.com – 1980 Draft
 Pro Football Hall of Fame

National Football League Draft
NFL Draft 1980
Draft
NFL Draft
NFL Draft
American football in New York City
1980s in Manhattan
Sporting events in New York City
Sports in Manhattan